Inglewood is a neighborhood of Nashville, Tennessee. It is located northeast of downtown Nashville, south of Madison and north of East Nashville.

Education
Schools in Inglewood are a part of Metropolitan Nashville Public Schools:
Inglewood Elementary School
Dan Mills Elementary
Isaac Litton Middle 
Stratford STEM Magnet High School

A branch of the Nashville Public Library is located in Inglewood.

References

Neighborhoods in Nashville, Tennessee